was a Japanese software development company that was in business from 1980 to 2003 based in Sapporo, Hokkaido. They started as a video game developer, releasing titles for various home computer platforms (including the Family Computer), but subsequently left the gaming business to focus solely on programming software and tools as they entered the 1990s.

History
The company was founded on May 2, 1980 under the name Computer Land Hokkaido, publishing video games for various home computers under the "7 Turkey" brand name. In 1984, they officially changed their name to dB-SOFT, taking their new name from the decibel (dB) unit.

Some of the company's most commercially successful video games include Flappy (which has been released in over 20 versions) and Woody Poco. dB-SOFT also published two pornographic games under the Macadamia Soft imprint: Macadam and 177 (the latter was banned from retail by the National Diet due to its controversial premise in which the player's objective is to pursue and rape a fleeing woman). In addition to gaming software, dB-SOFT also produced programming tools such as dB-BASIC (a BASIC compiler), P1.EXE (a word processor) and HOTALL (a web designing tool).

On August 1, 2001, dB-SOFT ceased operation after being merged into NetFarm Communications (a company founded by Reiko Furuya, Sadayaki Furuya's wife). Their former office building was sold off in 2002.

Softography

Notes

References

External links
Official website (Waybacked)
dB-SOFT games available at Project EGG
dB-SOFT at Giant Bomb

Companies based in Sapporo
Defunct video game companies of Japan
Video game development companies
Video game publishers
Video game companies established in 1980
Video game companies disestablished in 2001
Japanese companies established in 1980
Japanese companies disestablished in 2001